Attah is a surname. Notable people with the surname include:

Abraham Attah (born 2002), Ghanaian actor
Aliyu Attah, Nigerian policeman and former Inspector General of Police
Ayesha Harruna Attah (born 1983), Ghanaian-born fiction writer
Benjamin Ayesu-Attah (born 1993), Canadian sprinter
Daniel Attah (born 1978), Nigerian professional boxer
Ernest Attah, Military Governor of Cross River State, Nigeria
Jordan Attah Kadiri (born 2000), Nigerian professional footballer
Michael Kwame Attah, Ghanaian politician
Mike Attah, Military Administrator of Anambra State in Nigeria
Richard Attah (born 1995), Ghanaian professional footballer
Samuel Attah-Mensah, Ghanaian media personality, businessman and lecturer
Victor Attah (born 1938), Governor of Akwa Ibom State in Nigeria